Bourg or Le Bourg may refer to:

Places

France

Bourg
 Bourg, Aisne, a former commune in France, now part of Bourg-et-Comin
 Bourg, Bas-Rhin, a former commune in Bas-Rhin, now part of Bourg-Bruche
 Bourg, Gironde, also known as Bourg-sur-Gironde
 Bourg, Haute-Marne
 Bourg, Maine-et-Loire, a former commune of Maine-et-Loire, now part of Soulaire-et-Bourg
 Bourg-Achard, in Eure (département)
 Bourg-Archambault, Vienne (département)
 Bourg-Argental, Loire (département)
 Bourg-Beaudouin, Eure (département)
 Bourg-Blanc, Finistère
 Bourg-Bruche, Bas-Rhin
 Bourg-Charente, Charente
 Bourg-de-Bigorre, Hautes-Pyrénées
 Bourg-de-Péage, Drôme
 Bourg-des-Comptes, Ille-et-Vilaine
 Bourg-de-Sirod, Jura (département)
 Bourg-des-Maisons, Dordogne (département)
 Bourg-de-Thizy, Rhône (département)
 Bourg-de-Visa, Tarn-et-Garonne
 Bourg-d'Oueil, Haute-Garonne
 Bourg-du-Bost, Dordogne (département)
 Bourg-en-Bresse, Ain
 Bourg-et-Comin, Aisne (département)
 Bourg-Fidèle, Ardennes (département)
 Bourg-la-Reine, Hauts-de-Seine
 Bourg-Lastic, Puy-de-Dôme
 Bourg-le-Comte, Saône-et-Loire
 Bourg-le-Roi, Sarthe
 Bourg-lès-Valence, Drôme
 Bourg-l'Évêque, Maine-et-Loire
 Bourg-Madame, Pyrénées-Orientales
 Bourg-Saint-Andéol, Ardèche
 Bourg-Saint-Bernard, Haute-Garonne
 Bourg-Saint-Christophe, Ain
 Bourg-Sainte-Marie, Haute-Marne
 Bourg-Saint-Maurice, Savoie (département)
 Bourg-sous-Châtelet, Territoire de Belfort

Le Bourg
 Le Bourg, Lot (département)
 Le Bourg-d'Hem, Creuse (département)
 Le Bourg-d'Iré, Maine-et-Loire
 Le Bourg-d'Oisans, Isère (département)
 Le Bourg-Dun, Seine-Maritime
 Le Bourg-Saint-Léonard, Orne

Switzerland
 Bourg-Saint-Pierre, Valais canton

United States
Bourg, Louisiana

People
 Anne Bourg (born 1987), Luxembourgish footballer
 Daniel de Bourg (born 1976), British singer, songwriter, dancer, actor and model
 Dominique Bourg (born 1953), French philosopher
 Frank Bourg (1890–1955), American bank teller
 Hervé de Bourg-Dieu (c.1080–1150), French Benedictine exegete
 Joseph-Mathurin Bourg (1744–1797), Roman Catholic Spiritan priest
 Lorna Bourg, American charity director and President of the Southern Mutual Help Association (SMHA)
 MacKenzie Bourg (born 1992), American singer-songwriter
 Tony Bourg (1912–1991), Luxembourgish author, linguist, literary scholar and critic
 Willy Bourg (1934–2003), Luxembourgish politician

Other
 Côtes de Bourg, an Appellation d'origine contrôlée (AOC) for Bordeaux wine

See also

Other French placenames which include Bourg
 Boussac-Bourg, Creuse (département)
 Cherbourg-Octeville
 Chaumont-le-Bourg, Puy-de-Dôme
 Fontaine-le-Bourg, Seine-Maritime
 Grand-Bourg, Guadeloupe
 Le Grand-Bourg, Creuse (département)
 Granges-le-Bourg, Haute-Saône
 Hornoy-le-Bourg, Somme (département)
 Lurcy-le-Bourg, Nièvre
 Magnac-Bourg, Haute-Vienne
 Noroy-le-Bourg, Haute-Saône
 Petit-Bourg, Guadeloupe
 Saint-Cyr-en-Bourg, Maine-et-Loire
 Saint-Léger-du-Bourg-Denis, Seine-Maritime
 Saint-Bonnet-le-Bourg, Puy-de-Dôme
 Saint-Denis-lès-Bourg, Ain
 Saint-Seurin-de-Bourg, Gironde
 Soulaire-et-Bourg, Maine-et-Loire
 Vieux-Bourg, Calvados
 Le Vieux-Bourg, Côtes-d'Armor

Similar words
 Bergh (disambiguation)
 Borg (disambiguation)
 Borgh (disambiguation)
 Burg (disambiguation)
 Burgh (disambiguation)
 Dubourg, surname